Ka'am, Wadi Caam or Wadi Ka'am (Cinyps) is a small river in Tripolitana, site of a Greek colony with the same name who was founded by the Spartan Dorieus, but was failed to be established for long due to conflicts with the Carthaginians and the local tribe of Macae.

Sources
The source of the river are in the 80 km long Wadi Taraglat but they are all located at the coastal end of the Wadi in a part of the Wadi called Wadi Caam, whereas Herodotus had erroneously claimed that the source was near the Hill of Graces some 260 km inland.

History
The river was called at the ancient times Cinyps or Cinyphus (Κίνυφος). There was a town of the same name at its mouth.

The Greeks under Dorieus of Sparta who was said to be angry because Cleomenes was chosen to be king of Sparta ahead of him left the Peloponnese with other Spartans to found his own colony with people from Thera as his guides around 515/514 BC. He found his colony at the mouth of the Cinyps. Herodotus called the Cinyps river where the colony established as "the fairest part of Libya".
After around three years, they were expelled by the Carthaginians in alliance with the local tribe of Macae. The Greek colony was close to the Phoenician colony of Leptis Magna and was probably seen as a threat.

The local Libyan tribe of the Macae who were living in the area were used as mercenaries by the Carthaginians.

The springs in Wadi Caam were the source of the water used in the Hadrianic baths of Leptis Magna with the water diversion scheme using the aqueduct built by Quintus Servillius Candidus in 119-120A.D.

Mythology
In Greek mythology one of the combatants in the Trojan War, Guneus went to Libya after the war where he settled near the Cinyps River, although other myths have Guneus drowning at sea.

Archaeology
Archaeologists have uncovered a Greek necropolis in Wadi Caam which dates to the 3rd century BC, it consists of a series of stone, box-shaped urns with the lids in the shape of a sloping roof and containing ashes and bones, as well as various types of ceramics.

References 

Rivers of Libya
Spartan colonies
Greek colonies in Libya
Ancient Greek archaeological sites in Libya